The Medal of Honor Memorial is installed on the Washington State Capitol campus in Olympia, Washington, United States. The granite obelisk was dedicated on November 7, 1976.

References

Medal of Honor
1976 establishments in Washington (state)
1976 sculptures
Granite sculptures in Washington (state)
Monuments and memorials in Olympia, Washington
Obelisks in the United States